"Please Don't Go Girl" is a 1988 song by American boyband New Kids on the Block. The lead vocals were sung by Joey McIntyre, Jordan Knight, and spoken by Danny Wood, but the majority of the lyrics were sung by Joey McIntyre. Written and produced by Maurice Starr, it was the first release from their second album, Hangin' Tough (1988), and also became the group's first commercial hit. "Please Don't Go Girl" first rose from #62 to #46, on the US Billboard Hot 100 singles chart during the week of July 30, 1988. The single was the first major commercial exposure of the group, resulting in somewhat of a slow, but steady climb. The single eventually peaked at #10 the week of October 8, 1988. In 1997, Aaron Carter covered this song and was featured on his international self-titled debut album.

Lyrics
The song tells about a man who requests a woman he loves not to go away as she is his whole world, & he promises to love her until the end of time.

Critical reception
Pan-European magazine Music & Media described "Please Don't Go Girl" as "slick and smouldering soul, written and produced by Maurice Starr."

Music video
The first available music video for "Please Don't Go Girl" was shot at Coney Island, Brooklyn. However, the group's official website promotes another video that seems to have been recorded around the same time the other video was. This second video was shot in various places around Boston, including the Ruggles T station.

Track listings
 US 12"
A1. "Please Don't Go Girl" (Extended Mix) – 5:04
A2. "Please Don't Go Girl" (7" Version) – 3:59
B1. "Whatcha Gonna Do About It" (Dub Mix) – 5:28
B2. "Whatcha Gonna Do About It" (7" Version) – 3:55

 UK 12"
A1. "Please Don't Go Girl" (Extended Version) – 4:42
A2. "Please Don't Go Girl" – 3:59
B1. "Whatcha Gonna Do About It" (Dub Mix]) – 5:28
B2. "Whatcha Gonna Do About It" – 3:55

Versions
"Please Don't Go Girl" (Album Version) – 4:31
"Please Don't Go Girl" (Remix) – 4:37
"Please Don't Go Girl" (7" Version) – 4:12
"Please Don't Go Girl" (Video Version) – 5:23
"Please Don't Go Girl" (Extended Mix) – 5:05

Charts

Personnel
 Danny Wood - Spoken and Background Vocals
 Donnie Wahlberg - Background Vocals
 Joey McIntyre - Lead and Background Vocals
 Jonathan Knight - Background Vocals
 Jordan Knight - Lead and Background Vocals

Covers
Aaron Carter released a cover of this song on his debut album in 1997.

References

External links
Official video

1988 singles
New Kids on the Block songs
Pop ballads
1980s ballads
Columbia Records singles
Songs written by Maurice Starr
Song recordings produced by Maurice Starr
1988 songs